Dr Gautham Sigamani Pon is an Indian politician. He was elected to the Lok Sabha, lower house of the Parliament of India from Kallakurichi, Tamil Nadu in the 2019 Indian general election as member of the Dravida Munnetra Kazhagam.He is the son of K. Ponmudy. He along with wife Dr Kavitha Gautam run Bloom Healthcare.

References

External links
Official biographical sketch in Parliament of India website

India MPs 2019–present
Lok Sabha members from Tamil Nadu
Living people
Dravida Munnetra Kazhagam politicians
1974 births
People from Viluppuram district